François Furstenberg is a historian. He taught at the Université de Montréal and currently teaches at Johns Hopkins University.

Biography 
Furstenberg was born in Washington, D.C., and grew up in Boston, Massachusetts, and Washington. His grandmother, Edith H. Furstenberg, was a social worker and daughter of Sidney Hollander, a pharmacist who invented the Rem cough medicine and became a philanthropist. She married prominent Baltimore physician Frank F. Furstenberg and advocate for national health care legislation. His father, Mark Furstenberg, is a baker who runs the Bread Furst bakery and won a James Beard Foundation Award in 2017. His uncle is the University of Pennsylvania sociologist Frank Furstenberg and his aunt, Carla Furstenberg Cohen, founded and owned the Chevy Chase bookstore Politics and Prose.

Furstenberg received his B.A. from Columbia University and Ph.D. from Johns Hopkins University. His research focuses explores the history of the United States and the Atlantic World in the eighteenth and nineteenth centuries. He has written about the history of slavery in the United States and the history of French émigrés in the United States.

He was elected a member of the American Antiquarian Society in 2013.

Works 
 In the Name of the Father: Washington’s Legacy, Slavery, and the Making of a Nation (2006)
 When the United States Spoke French: Five Refugees who Shaped a Nation (2014)

References

External links 
 http://www.oah.org/lectures/lecturers/view/1569
 https://www.c-span.org/person/?francoisfurstenberg
 https://www.benfranklinsworld.com/017/
 http://history.jhu.edu/directory/francois-furstenberg/

Living people
Year of birth missing (living people)

Johns Hopkins University alumni
Columbia College (New York) alumni
Johns Hopkins University faculty
American historians
Historians of slavery
Academic staff of the Université de Montréal